Sayyid Muhammad-Hasan al-Sadr (7 January 1882 – 3 April 1956) was an Iraqi Shi'ite statesman. He served as Prime Minister of Iraq from 29 January 1948 to 26 June 1948.

Life
A member of the prominent Sadr family, claiming descent from the prophet Muhammad, he received a traditional Islamic education. An active Arab nationalist before World War I, in 1919/20 he founded the nationalist party National Guard  (al-Haras al-Watani) and helped organize the Iraqi revolt against the British. Escaping arrest by fleeing to Najd, he subsequently returned to Iraq. He was appointed to the Senate of Iraq, and served as its President from November 1929 to February 1937, and from December 1937 to December 1943. 

In January 1948 the signing of the Portsmouth treaty led to the Al-Wathbah uprising and the fall of Salih Jabr's government. As-Sadr became Prime Minister for five months. Though he never returned to executive office, he served as President of the Senate again in 1948.

He died on 3 April 1956.

References 

1882 births
1956 deaths
Prime Ministers of Iraq
Presidents of the Senate of Iraq
Iraqi Shia Muslims